The 2013-14 season is Burton Albion's fifth consecutive season in League Two. They finished 4th in the previous season but failed to get promotion via the playoffs.  It is Gary Rowett's second season as manager of the club.

Overview

League 

Burton Albion's league campaign began well with a 2–2 away draw against Cheltenham Town on the opening day of the season,  which was followed by a 1–0 victory versus Rochdale in their first home game of the season. In the following match they held off a Fleetwood Town comeback to beat the Lancashire side 3–2, to give them their first league away win since March 2013 (excluding play-offs).

Cup Competitions

League Cup 

In the League Cup, Burton were drawn against Sheffield United away in the first round.  They won 2–1.  On 8 August 2013, they were drawn a home tie against Premier League side Fulham in the second round. Against Fulham, Albion equalised with five minutes remaining through Jack Dyer before taking the lead 12 minutes into extra-time, before conceding through Hugo Rodallega. After the 2–2 draw Phil Edwards was the only player to miss a penalty and Albion crashed out 4–5 in the shoot-out. After the match Burton manager Gary Rowett said he was incredibly proud to nearly knock the Premier League side out.

Football League Trophy 

On 17 August 2013, Burton were drawn away to Notts County in the first round of the Football League Trophy.

Transfers

Squad 
Last updated: 30 November 2013

Results

Pre-Season

League Two

Play-offs

League table

Results summary

Results by round

FA Cup

League Cup

Football League Trophy

Squad statistics
Updated 16 April 2014

|-
|colspan="14"|Players featured for Burton but left before the end of the season:

|}

Top scorers
Last updated: 4 January 2014

Scorers are organised by goals and then alphabetically through surname.

Displinary Record 
Last updated: 30 November 2013
This is ordered by points, 1 pt for a yellow and 2 pts for a red.

References

External links 
 

Burton Albion F.C. seasons
Burton Albion